5641 McCleese, provisional designation , is a rare-type Hungaria asteroid and slow rotator, classified as Mars-crosser from the innermost regions of the asteroid belt, approximately 4 kilometers in diameter.

It was discovered on 27 February 1990, by American astronomer Eleanor Helin at Palomar Observatory in California, and later named for JPL-scientist Daniel McCleese.

Classification and orbit 

McCleese is classified as a bright and rare A-type asteroid in the SMASS taxonomy. It is a member of the Hungaria family, which form the innermost dense concentration of asteroids in the Solar System. With a perihelion of 1.589 AU, McCleese also crosses the orbit of Mars.

The asteroid orbits the Sun in the innermost main-belt at a distance of 1.6–2.0 AU once every 2 years and 5 months (896 days). Its orbit has an eccentricity of 0.13 and an inclination of 22° with respect to the ecliptic.

Lightcurve 

Photometric observations of McCleese by Brian Warner and René Roy in 2005 and 2007, gave three rotational lightcurves that had a rotation period between 7.2 and 28.8 hours with a brightness variation of 0.06 to 0.50 magnitude. In June 2010, McCleese was again observed by Brian Warner at his Palmer Divide Observatory in Colorado, United States. By combining his data points with the previously obtained photometric data, he was able to derive a period of  hours with an amplitude of 1.30 magnitude. With a period of 418 hours, the body is one of the Top 100 slow rotators known to exist.

Diameter estimates 

According to the surveys carried out by the Infrared Astronomical Satellite IRAS and NASA's Wide-field Infrared Survey Explorer with its subsequent NEOWISE mission, McCleese measures 5.68 and 4.00 kilometers in diameter, and its surface has an albedo of 0.455 and 0.34, respectively. In agreement with WISE, the Collaborative Asteroid Lightcurve Link assumes an albedo of 0.3 and derives a diameter of 3.67 kilometers using an absolute magnitude of 14.1.

Naming 

This minor planet is named after American JPL scientist Daniel J. McCleese, who is a physicist and manager at JPL's Science Division. He also played an important role for the Near-Earth Asteroid Tracking program (NEAT). The approved naming citation was published by the Minor Planet Center on 4 April 1996.

References

External links 
 Lightcurve plot of 5641 McCleese, Palmer Divide Observatory, B. D. Warner (2010)
 Asteroid Lightcurve Database (LCDB), query form (info )
 Dictionary of Minor Planet Names, Google books
 Asteroids and comets rotation curves, CdR – Observatoire de Genève, Raoul Behrend
 Discovery Circumstances: Numbered Minor Planets (5001)-(10000) – Minor Planet Center
 
 

Mars-crossing asteroids
Hungaria asteroids
McCleese
McCleese
Slow rotating minor planets
A-type asteroids (SMASS)
19900227